The Ambassador of South Korea to Peru is the chief diplomatic representative of the Republic of Korea accredited to Peru. The ambassador services the Embassy of South Korea in Lima.

Relations between Peru and South Korea were established in 1963 and have been maintained since.

List of representatives

See also
List of ambassadors of Peru to South Korea

Notes

References

 
Peru
Korea, South